Chillout Sessions is a series of compilations released by Ministry of Sound that focus on songs from the chillout genre. Songs on Chillout Sessions compilations vary in style from lounge to electronica and are released by many different artists.

The Chillout Out genre of compilations started in the UK and since 2003 Ministry of Sound has released them under different tropes such as "Chilled", "After Hours", "The Morning After..." which has shown MOS to have seemingly ended its branding of the genre as Chillout Sessions.

A similar series started in Australia, where the series changed its name from The Chillout Session to The Chillout Sessions and then simply to Chillout Sessions and continued until 2016 with XIX until the record label rebranded to TMRW following the acquisition of MoS by Sony in the UK.

Some Chillout Sessions albums have become known and distinguishable for the symbol of a turntable (with the Ministry of Sound logo on it) frozen in ice, or in one case (The Summer Collection 2003) the turntable itself is made of ice. In the UK this motif is used on the covers of volumes 1, 2, The Winter Collection (2003), The Summer Collection 2003, and The Very Best of album. In Australia, the image is used for volumes 1–6 except on volume 3. The idea of the turntable with the Ministry of Sound logo on had been used on the covers of the Ministry of Sound Clubbers Guide in prior years (and in The Annual IV), the idea of such turntable on the covers was last used on Clubbers Guide albums in early 2001 when The Chillout Session began using the idea.

History
Ministry of Sound, as a label, began in 1993 and its first album was the first volume of a series called Sessions. The series was successful enough for it to generate a spin-off series of The Chillout Session, which began in 2001 with a UK Compilation Chart #1 album. Volume 2 was also very successful. The first and second volumes were released in both the UK and Australia, but the series divided in August 2001, with one series for the UK and the other for Australia.

In the UK, Ibiza Chillout Session was released in August 2001. Although not as successful as the prior releases, it received positive reviews, as did the Ibiza 2002 album. Though the four albums released were part of the Sessions series, the fifth album The Chillout Annual 2002 was part of The Annual series, which was the Ministry of Sound's second series of mix albums, and likewise had Ibiza Annual spin-offs beginning in 1998.

Following the numbered releases (volumes 1 and 2) and both the Ibiza... releases, the albums were themed to seasons, starting with The Winter Collection 2003 (actually released in late 2002, as the sort of style Chillout Annual 2003). The Summer 2003 edition reached #10 in the UK Compilations Chart. A third Ibiza... edition, Ibiza Sunsets, was released shortly afterwards. This series, despite sales success, was suspended in favour of other Ministry of Sound albums in 2003. Its final album The Very Best of the Chillout Sessions was released in late 2003, but did not sell well and until 2011 was the worst-selling album in the series.

Ministry of Sound started the series again in January 2006, with an album titled simply The Chillout Sessions (titled to reflect the fact that it was a reboot for the series). This album had good sales but there were no subsequent releases.

In 2007, Ministry of Sound launched a new series, Anthems, beginning with Anthems 1991–2008. It sold very well and it generated a spin-off album, Chilled 1991–2008. This was followed by a second volume in 2009, a third (suited to acoustic chill-out music) in 2010 and a fourth (Chilled Afterhours, similar to the label's Late Night Sessions albums) in 2011. 2011 was also the year that Ministry of Sound launched its large-scale campaign 20:20, to celebrate 20 years of The Ministry of Sound as a club. One of the associated releases was the box set XX Twenty Years, each disc made up of a different dance genre; the final disc in the box set was Chillout Sessions. Around the same time, Anthems Collection was released, with five discs, each from a different genre, the final one being Anthems Chilled.

Amongst the releases from 2002–2004, Ministry of Sound UK also launched spin-off compilations such as Late Night Sessions and Late Night Sessions: Autumn/Winter Collection.
With the genre tiring somewhat (the same songs were appearing repeatedly) Ministry of Sound has continued to release Chill Out genre compilations under different guises in the UK. By 2016 these were distinctly split between house-based chillout tracks (Chilled House Sessions 1–7, "Morning After...) to more chart-friendly (compared to the eclectic range of earlier releases) compilations (The Chillout Session (2012), Perfectly Chilled and Just Chillin). 2016–2017 has notably been a key focus on chillout albums from MoS, much like the early 00s when Dance music had reached its zenith, due to the EDM emergence in America that has moved onto producing slower electronic tracks that combine synths with slower house rhythms or hip-hop beats.

In Australia, the series has been a continued success from Volume 3 in 2002. In a different approach from the UK, the Australian series maintained the numbering system as a suffix in its titles, with only the "Best of..." style album Chillout Classics omitting a number from the title.

In 2016, the Ministry of Sound UK record label was sold to Sony Music. The label is run as an independent and split between A&R and Compilations. The Compilations team were retained when moving to Sony.

Since 2018, Ministry of Sound exclusively moved their Playlists to Apple Music. Many of their well known compilation brands such as Anthems, Fitness, I Love and Chilled have moved to a Playlist format, which accounts for the limited releases of non-streamable Chilled Compilation albums. A notable example is the Chilled House Session series that ran from 2009 to its final release in 2019 (Chilled House Session 9) and is now an exclusive Playlist on Apple Music.

In January 2022, Ministry of Sound released Chillout Sessions (Calm Mixes), an album of three one hour tracks called Ibiza, Energy and Clarity. The album is available to buy from iTunes and streamable (as an album, not a playlist). Each track is a single song and this is not a compilation album.

List of albums in the Ministry of Sound Chillout Genre

UK
 The Chillout Session (2001)
 The Chillout Session 2 (2001)
 Ibiza Chillout Session (2001)
 The Chillout Annual 2002 (2001)
 The Chillout Session: Ibiza 2002 (2002)
 The Chillout Session 2003: The Winter Collection (2002)
 The Karma Collection (2002)
 Late Night Sessions (2003)
 The Chillout Session: The Summer Collection 2003 (2003)
 The Chillout Session: Ibiza Sunsets (2003)
 The Very Best of the Chillout Session (2003)
 Late Night Sessions Autumn Collection (2003)
 The Karma Collection Sunrise (2003)
 The Chillout Session (2006)
 Chilled 1991–2008 (2008)
 Chilled II 1991–2009 (2009)
 The Chilled House Session (2009)
 Chilled Acoustic (2010)
 The Winter Sessions (2010)
 The Chilled House Session 2 (2011)
 Chilled Afterhours (2011)
 Chillout Session (CD4 in XX: Twenty Years, 2011)
 Late Night Sessions (2011)
 Anthems Chilled (CD5 in Anthems Collection, 2011)
 The Chilled House Session 3 (2012)
 Chillout Session (CD4 in XX Volume 2, 2012)
 The Chillout Session 2012 (2012)
 The Chilled House Session 4 (2013)
 Chilled House Classics (2013)
 Chilled House Ibiza 2013 (2013)
 The Chilled House Session 5 (2014)
 Chilled House Ibiza 2014 (2014)
 The Morning After The Night Before (2014)
 The Chilled House Session 6 (2015)
 Chilled House Ibiza 2015 (2015)
 Chilled (2015)
 Perfectly Chilled (2015)
 The Morning After... (2015)
 The Chilled House Session 7 (2016)
 Just Chillin (2016)
 Chilled Electronic 80s (2016)
 Chilled House Ibiza 2016 (2016)
 Recover (2016)
 Chilled Reggae (2016)
 Chilled Hip Hop (2016)
 Chilled House Winter (2016)
 Chilled House Session 8 (2017)
 Recover 2017 (2017)
 Laidback Beats 2017 (2017)
 Chilled House Ibiza 2017 (2017)
 Sunset Chilled (2017)
 Chilled House Session 9 (2018)
 I Love Acoustic (2018)
 Chilled 60’s (2018)
 Throw Back Chillout (2019)

Australia
 (The Chillout Session) (2001) Available only in UK import in CD
 The Chillout Session 2 (2001)
 The Chillout Annual 2002 (2002)
 The Chillout Sessions 3 (2002)
 Chillout Sessions 4 (2003)
 The Chillout Sessions : Summer Collection 2004
 Late Night Sessions (2003)
 Chillout Sessions 5 (2004)
 Chillout Sessions 6 (2004)
 Chillout Sessions 7 (2005)
 Chillout Sessions 8 (2005)
 Chillout Sessions 9 (2006)
 Chillout Sessions 10 (2007)
 Chillout Classics (2007)
 Chillout Sessions XI (2008)
 Chillout Sessions XII (2009)
 Chillout Sessions XIII (2010)
 Chillout Sessions XIV (2011)
 Chillout Sessions XV (2012)
 Chillout Sessions Classics (2013)
 Chillout Sessions XVI (2013)
 Chillout Sessions XVII (2014)
 Chillout Sessions XVIII (2015)
 Chillout Sessions XIX (2016)
 Chillout Sessions XX (2018)

Other releases
 The Chillout Guide (2001)
 The Chillout Annual 2002 (2001) – Different track listing to UK album
 Chilled Sessions (2008) – Download album
 Anthems Acoustic (2016) – A "chilled" complication but not by name
 Stripped: Acoustic R&B (2017) – A "chilled" complication but not by name
 Chillout Sessions (Calm Mixes) (2022) - A three track album of original tracks

Issues (Australian series)

The Chillout SessionThe Chillout Session is the first compilation in the series and was released on 5 February 2001 in the United Kingdom and Australia. Its cover image is used again for The Chillout Guide later in the year. Its cover image was actually first used in 1998 in the booklet of The Annual IV and later as the cover for the Ministry of Sound book The Manual.

The album reached #1 in the UK compilation album chart.

Disc One
 Badly Drawn Boy – "The Shining"
 Fatboy Slim feat. Macy Gray – "Demons"
 Chicane – "No Ordinary Morning"
 Groove Armada – "Dusk You And Me"
 Nightmares on Wax – "Les Nuits"
 Sneaker Pimps – "6 Underground (Nellee Hooper's Edit)"
 Rob Dougan – "Clubbed To Death"
 World Party – "Is It Too Late? (Pete Lorimer Remix)"
 The Beloved – "The Sun Rising (Toms D&B Mix)"
 LTJ Bukem – "Horizons"
 Tim 'Love' Lee – "One Night Samba"
 Thievery Corporation – "So Com Voce"
 Lemon Jelly – "In The Bath"
 Kinobe – "Keefe's Quest"
 Bonobo – "Kota"
 Moby – "Natural Blues"
 The Stone Roses – "Shoot You Down (The Soul Hooligan Remix)"
 Basement Jaxx – "Being With U"

Disc Two
 Jakatta – "American Dream (Radio Edit) (3:26)
 York – "The Awakening (Mellow Mix)" (5:15)
 Sasha & Emerson – "Scorchio (Emerson's Late Night Dub)" (2:34)
 Medway – "Resurrection" (6:28)
 Underworld – "Cups (Salt City Orchestra's Vertical Bacon Vocal)" (7:36)
 Etienne De Crecy – "Prix Choc (Alex Gopher's Free Tax Mix)" (3:56)
 Afro Medusa – "Pasilda (Afterlife Mix)" (4:07)
 Wamdue Project – "King of My Castle (Original Radio Edit)" (3:32)
 Alex Gopher – "The Child" (4:18)
 Bent – "Swollen (Beloved Café Del Marsh Mix) (4:24)
 Sumsonic Presents... – "Falling" (6:09)
 Amber – "Sexual (Afterlife Mix)" (4:26)
 Bedrock – "Beautiful Strange (Acoustic Mix)" (4:01)
 Leftfield – "Melt" (3:52)
 Orion – "Eternity (Acoustic Mix)" (4:20)
 Watergate – "Merry Christmas Mr. Lawrence (Heart of Asia) (Astro Heavenly Mix)" (3:35)
 Energy 52 – "Café Del Mar (Michael Woods Remix)" (3:47)
 William Orbit – "Barber's Adagio For Strings" (1:47)

The Chillout Session 2

The Chillout Session 2 is the second installment in the series and was released on 3 July 2001 in the United Kingdom and Australia. It reached #2 in the UK compilation album chart.

Disc One
 Dido – "Here With Me" (4:13)
 The Avalanches – "Since I Left You" (3:58)
 I Monster – "Daydream in Blue" (3:19)
 Groove Armada – "At The River" (4:14)
 Massive Attack – "Weather Storm" (4:54)
 Chicane – "Offshore" (4:47)
 Jakatta – "American Dream" (4:13)
 Zero 7 – "Give It Away" (5:06)
 Smoke City – "Underwater Love" (3:47)
 Kinobe – "Slip into Something More Comfortable" (4:30)
 Rae & Christian featuring Veba – "Spellbound (3:43)
 Pepe Deluxé – "Before You Leave" (3:49)
 Bentley Rhythm Ace – "Bentley's Gonna Sort You Out" (3:32)
 Hairy Diamond – "Givin Up" (2:42)
 Skinny – "Worth It" (3:21)
 Lemon Jelly – "Come" (3:57)
 Mr. Natural – "Playing To Win" (3:57)
 Bent – "Private Road" (4:10
 Radiohead – "Street Spirit (Fade Out)" (4:12)

Disc Two
 Everything But The Girl Vs. Soul Vision – "Tracey in My Room (Original Mix)" (4:11)
 Dubtribe Sound System – "Do It Now (Original Mix)" (3:48)
 Underworld – "Jumbo (Future Shock World's Apart Vox)" (5:50)
 Banda Sonora & G Club – "Guitarra G [Original Chill Out Mix]" (4:34)
 Faithless – "Drifting Away (Album Mix)" (2:44)
 Breezin' – "Clouds" (4:20)
 Deadly Avenger – "Day One" (4:26)
 Roger Sanchez – "Another Chance (Afterlife Mix)" (5:14)
 Full Intention & Shena – "I'll Be Waiting (Lux Remix)" (3:39)
 Ruff Driverz – "Savannah" (4:40)
 Santos – "Hear My Soul" (2:48)
 Kristine Blond – "Love Shy (Sandgate Remix)" (4:21)
 Pilgrims of The Mind – "Nothing Can Pull Us Apart (Full Length) (4:14)
 Delerium – "Silence" (3:48)
 BT – "Shame (Bent Instrumental" (3:34)
 Origin – "Refined Intricacy (Full Vox)" (3:39)
 Schiller – "Das Glockenspiel (Schill Out Mix)" (5:35)
 The Aloof – "One Night Stand (7" Edit)" (4:34)

The Chillout Sessions 3

The Chillout Sessions 3 is the third installment in the series and was released on 30 September 2002. It was the first album to be released in Australia only, and the first to use the name 'Sessions' in the title instead of simply 'Session'

The front cover uses the same image that the UK release The Chillout Session: Ibiza 2002 does.

Disc One
 1 Giant Leap – "My Culture"
 Groove Armada – "My Friend"
 Air – "All I Need"
 Basement Jaxx – "Romeo (Acoustic Mix)"
 Lamb – "What Sound"
 Roger Sanchez – "Another Chance (Acoustic Version)"
 Kinobe – "Summer in the Studio"
 Moby – "We Are All Made of Stars (Downtempo)"
 Nitin Sawhney – "Sunset"
 Timo Maas – "Hash Drivien"
 Fatboy Slim – "The Weekend Starts Here"
 Sia – "Drink to Get Drunk"
 Gt – "You Are Here"
 Etienne De Crecy – "Tempovision"
 Charles Webster – "Ready"
 Jazzanova – "Bohemian Sunset"
 Felix Da Housecat – "Runaway Dreamer"
 Paul Mac feat. Abby Dobson – "Gonna Miss You (Kinobe Remix)"
 Nuyorican Soul – "I Am The Black Gold of the Sun (4 Hero Remix)"
 Kosheen – "Hide You (Acoustic Mix)"
 Zero 7 – "Destiny"

Disc Two
 X-Press 2 feat. David Byrne – "Lazy"
 Matt Darey & Marcella Woods – "Beautiful (Stuart Crichton Radio Mix)"
 Blue Six – "Music & Wine (Th'attaboy Vocal)"
 Mambana – "No Reason (DJ Meri Vox Mix)"
 Jakatta – "So Lonely (Photek Mix)"
 DB Boulevard – "Point of View (Original Club Mix)"
 Kings of Tomorrow – "Young Hearts (San's Vibe Mix)"
 Freddy & Herman – "Aquarius"
 Hi Fi Mike – "Stereo Flavas – (Lum's Original Flava Remix)"
 Shakedown – "At Night (Afterlife Mix)"
 Ad Finem – "If You Fall (Jask's Fall From Heaven Mix)"
 Layo & Bushwacka! – "Love Story"
 D*note – "Shed My Skin (Pete Heller's Stylus Mix)"
 Jam & Spoon – "Stella"
 Saint Etienne – "Action"
 Beth Orton – "Central Reservation (Spiritual Life Ibadan Edit)"

Chillout Sessions 4

Chillout Sessions 4 is the fourth installment in the series. It was the first to remove "The" from the title, leaving the series title simply 'Chillout Sessions'.

The front cover uses the same image that the UK release The Chillout Session 2003: Winter Collection does.

Disc One
 Jakatta feat. Seal – "My Vision (Summer in White Edit)"
 Morcheeba – "Otherwise"
 Massive Attack – "Special Cases"
 Air – "Playground Love"
 Moby – "In This World"
 Röyksopp – "Eple (Fatboy Slim Remix)"
 Ralph Myerz and the Jack Herren Band – "Nikita"
 Faithless – "Crazy English Summer"
 Rob Dougan – "Clubbed To Death (Kurayamino Variation)"
 Björk – "It's in Our Hands"
 Lamb – "Gabriel"
 David Bridie – "Hotel Radio"
 Futureshock feat. Ben Onono – "On My Mind (Electric Lounge Session)"
 Charles Webster feat. Del St. Joseph – "Sweet Butterfly"
 SW – "Sweet Lullabies"
 Floris – "One More Day"
 St. Germain – "Sure Thing"
 Underworld – "Sola Sistim"
 Armin Van Buuren feat. Ray Wilson – "Yet Another Day (Armin's Downtempo Interpretation Edit)"

Disc Two
 Room 5 feat. Oliver Cheatham – "Make Luv (Extended Mix)"
 Moloko – "Familiar Feeling (Martin Buttrich remix)"
 Bent – "Magic Love (Ashley Beedle's Black Magic Vocal Mix)"
 Jamiroquai – "Corner of the Earth (Milk & Sugar Club Mix)"
 Sade – "By Your Side (Ben Watt Lazy Dog Mix)"
 Kaskade – "It's You, It's Me"
 Sandy Rivera feat. Haze – "Changes (Ben Watt Lazy Dog Remix)"
 Jakatta – "One Fine Day (Cicada Remix)"
 Groove Armada – "Healing"
 Gabin – "Doo Uap, Doo Uap, Doo Uap"
 Hi Fi Serious – "Because"
 Stylophonic – "If Everybody in the World Loved Everybody in the World"
 DJ Cam – "Une Ete A Paris (Summer in Paris)"
 In-Grid – "You Promised Me (Tu Es Foutu) (Original Extended Version)"
 Weekend Players – "21st Century"
 Krystal K – "Let's Get It Right (Firty Trikz Fake Remix)"
 Manijama feat. Mukupa & L'il T – "No, No, No (Jask Thaisoul Mix)"
 De Nuit – "All That Mattered (Love You Down) (Coloursound Vlub Mix)"
 2 Heads – "Out of the City (Hardkandy Mix)"
 iiO – "At The End (Sat + Howler Remix)"

Chillout Sessions 5

Fifth in the series, Chillout Sessions 5 is a two-disc compilation of songs by various artists that was released in 2004. Its front cover uses the same image that the UK release The Very Best of the Chillout Session does. The image is also similar to that used on the front cover of Chillout Classics.

Disc One
 Zero 7 – "Home"
 Sia – "Breathe Me (Four Tet Remix)"
 Lamb – "Wonder"
 Coldplay – "The Scientist"
 Jack Johnson – "Taylor"
 Joss Stone – "Fell in Love with a Boy"
 Vassy – "Cover You in Kisses (Golden Katalyst Remix)"
 Nitin Sawhney – "Rainfall"
 Jamiroquai – "Corner of the Earth"
 11cc – "I'm Not in Love"
 Car Stereo Wars – "Come To Nothing"
 Water – "No Goodbye"
 Mylo – "Valley of the Dolls"
 Plump DJs feat. Louise Rhodes – "Morning Sun"
 Ikon – "Calling You"
 Paul Jackson feat. Steve Smith – "The Push (Far From Here)"
 Motorcycle – "As The Rush Comes (Gabriel & Dresden Chillout Mix)"
 The Chemical Brothers feat. The Flaming Lips – "The Golden Path"
 Bang Bang – "Don't Care"
 Turin Brakes – "Feeling Oblivion"

Disc Two
 DJ Sneak – "Summer Song"
 Doctor Rockit – "Café De Flore (Charles Webster's Latin Lovers Mix)"
 Isolée – "Beau Mot Plage (Freeform Reform Parts I & II)"
 Malou – "I Wish (Trentemøller Late Night Mix)"
 DJ T- "Philly"
 Dino – "Dance Like The Old Days"
 Röyksopp – "Remind Me"
 Moloko – "Cannot Contain This"
 Starsailor – "Four to the Floor (Thin White Duke Mix)"
 Cut Copy – "Future"
 Deepest Blue – "Give It Away"
 Groove Armada – "But I Feel Good"
 Crazy Penis – "You Started Something"
 Soundz Fresh – "Human Nature (Club Vox Break Mix)"
 Taurine – "Growing on Me"
 Martin Solveig – "Someday"
 Lisa Shaw – "Always"
 Mood II Swing – "Can't Get Away (Shine Vocal Mix)"
 A Hundred Birds – "Jaguar"
 God Within – "Raincry (Vance Musgrove Remix)"

Chillout Sessions 6

Chillout Sessions 6 is a two-disc compilation of songs by various artists that was released in December 2004. The red B&B Italia UP series "Big Momma" chair & footstool featured on the album cover was courtesy of the Space Furniture site.

Disc One
 Missy Higgins – "Nightminds (Dave Higgins Remix)"
 Zero 7 – "Somersault"
 Shapeshifters – "Lola's Theme (Lola's Lounging Mix)"
 Bent – "Sunday 29th"
 Ben Harper & The Blind Boys of Alabama – "There Will Be A Light"
 Mark Farina – "Dream Machine"
 The 411 – "On My Knees"
 Kaskade – "Steppin' Out (Late Night Alumni Slow Dance Remix)"
 Taurine – "Dreams of Hope"
 Dynamoe – "In Your Own Time"
 Hi Fi Mike – "I'll Carry You"
 Sia – "Don't Bring Me Down"
 The Dissociatives – "Forever and a Day"
 Jet – "Look What You've Done"
 Gomez – "Sweet Virginia"
 Coldplay – "Don't Panic"
 Dave Seaman pres. Group Therapy feat. Nat Leonard – "My Own Worst Enemy (Spector Mix)"
 Mylo – "Need You Tonight"
 Cut Copy – "Saturdays"
 Max Sedgley – "Happy"

Disc Two
 Hardsoul feat. Ron Carroll – "Back Together (Copyright Reprise Mix)"
 Soldiers of Twilight – "Believe (Martin Solveig Vocal Dub)"
 Cajmere feat. Walter Phillips – "Midnight (MG's Funk'd Vocal Mix)"
 Martin Solveig – "I'm A Good Man"
 Fred Everything feat. Karl The Voice – "For Your Pleasure"
 Low – "Tonight (Ben Watt Night Flight Remix)"
 Ben Watt – "Lone Cat (Holding On)"
 Sandy Rivera – "Dreams (Rasmus Faber Remix)"
 DJ Gregory – "The Joburg Theme"
 Justin Martin – "The Sad Piano (Charles Webster Remix)"
 Toby Neal – "Feelin' Alright"
 Shakedown – "Love Game (Original Shakedown Mix)"
 Mr. Scruff – "Get A Move On"
 Sweet Coffee – "Don't Need You (Den Hetrix & Cash'mir House Mix)"
 J:Sonic feat. Jon Fitz & Abigail Bailey – "Release The Pressure (Instrumental)"
 Dino – "Call Me (In A Club Mix)"
 Phoenix – "If I Ever Feel Better"
 Télépopmusik – "Breathe"
 Soul Central – "Strings of Life (The Funky Lowlives Remix)"

Chillout Sessions 7

Chillout Sessions 7 is the seventh installment of the Chillout Sessions series of compilations, released by Ministry of Sound.

Disc One
 Télépopmusik featuring Angela McClusky – "Don't Look Back"
 Freeform Five – "Easy"
 Bang Gang – "Inside"
 Infusion – "Invisible"
 Snow Patrol – "Run (Jacknife Lee Remix)"
 Athlete – "Wires"
 Lior – "This Old Love"
 Phoenix – "Love for Granted"
 Hardkandy – "Big Sand"
 Hi Fi Mike – "Secretly Watching Me"
 A Man Called Adam – "Estelle"
 Vassy – "Loverman"
 Mylo – "Sunworshipper"
 Husky Rescue – "Summertime Cowboy"
 Fatboy Slim – "The Joker"
 Flevans – "Lay It Down"
 Just Jack – "Snowflakes (Cured by Temple of Jey)"
 Rune featuring Morten Luco – "Nothing New (Mosquito Remix)"
 Milosh – "You Make Me Feel"
 Air – "Alone in Kyoto"

Disc Two
 Spektrum – "Kinda New"
 Phonique featuring Erlend Oye – "For The Time Being"
 Rachael Starr – "Till There Was You (John Creamer & Stephane K Radio Mix)"
 Alexkid with Lissette Alea – "Don't Hide It"
 ArtOfDisco by Vince – "Superworld"
 Turntablerocker – "TT.roy (Dub)"
 Andre Krami featuring Schad Privat – "Safari"
 Juliet – Avalon
 Evil Nine – "Hired Goons"
 Bang Bang – "Silicone (The Mighty Bop vs Blackjoy Dub)"
 Bent – "Comin' Back"
 Unity – "I Love You (Manoo and François A Remix)"
 Lisa Shaw – "Let It Ride (Jimpster Remix)"
 Greens Keepers featuring Colette – "Keep It Down"
 Lemon Jelly – "Stay With You"
 Black Grass – "Aporia"
 Lazyboy – "Police, Dogs, Bonfire (Linus Loves Remix)"
 Mocky featuring Jamie Lidell – "How Will I Know You"
 Cagedbaby – "Hello There"
 Candi Staton – "You Got The Love (New Voyager Remix)"

Chillout Sessions 8

Chillout Sessions 8 is the eighth installment in the Chillout Sessions series, released by Ministry of Sound.

Disc One
 Emilíana Torrini – "Sunny Road"
 Lior – "Daniel"
 Breaks Co-Op – "The Otherside"
 Alexkid – "Turn It Round Again"
 Boozoo Bajou feat. Wayne Martin – "Moanin'"
 Radiohead – "Climbing Up The Walls (Zero 7 Mix)"
 Husky Rescue – "New Light of Tomorrow (Bonobo Remix)"
 Kraak & Smaak – "Danse Macabre"
 Datarock – "The Most Beautiful Girl"
 Steve Mac vs. Mosquito feat. Steve Smith – "Lovin' You More (That Big Track) (Mosquito Chillout Mix)"
 Alpinestars – "Burning Up"
 Tosca – "Rondo Acapricio"
 Manhead – "Doop"
 Stereo MCs – "First Love"
 Dr. Rubberfunk – "Latin Player"
 Plantlife – "When She Smiles She Lights The Sky (4Hero Mix)"
 Lemon Jelly – "'95 Aka Make Things Right"
 Paul Mac feat. Peta Morris – "Sunshine Eyes"
 Ian Brown – "Time Is My Everything (Album Version)"

Disc Two
 Scissor Sisters – "Comfortably Numb"
 Hot Toddy – "Mindtrip"
 Rithma feat. Ryralio Djs – "The Funk Is Still Alive (Ryralio Djs Mix)"
 Recloose feat. Joe Dukie – "Dust"
 Kings of Tomorrow – "Another Day"
 Schmoov! – "Spirits (Lights Out Mix)"
 Rise Ashen – "Second Wind"
 Fred Everything – "Light of Day"
 Blaze presents UDA feat. Barbara Tucker – "Most Precious Love (Franck Roger Remix)"
 Bah Samba feat. Isabel Fructuoso – "Calma (Louie Vega Remix)"
 Chuck Love – "El Divorcee"
 Jamiroquai – "Seven Days in Sunny June (Steve Mac Classic Mix)"
 Copyright Present One Track Mind – "Essence of Life (Main Mix)"
 Julien Jabre – "Swimming Places"
 Mark Farina – "Cali Spaces (Kaskade Mix)"
 Grooveyard – "7 Mile"
 Moreno – "Firebird (Ocean Beach Mix)"
 Axwell feat. Steve Edwards – "Watch The Sunrise (Original Ha Ha Ha Mix)"
 Bob Sinclar – "Love Generation (Club Mix)"

Chillout Sessions 9

Chillout Sessions 9 is the ninth installment in the Chillout Sessions series, released by Ministry of Sound.

Disc One
 José González – "Heartbeats"
 Angus and Julia Stone – "Paper Aeroplane"
 Max Sedgley – "Slowly"
 Gotye – "Hearts A Mess"
 Gomez – "Notice"
 Thom Yorke – "Black Swan"
 Telemetry Orchestra – "Shine"
 Sébastien Tellier – "La Ritournelle"
 Camille – "Ta Douleur"
 Ben Westbeech – "So Good Today"
 Peter Bjorn and John- "Young Folks"
 Jenny Wilson – "Let My Shoes Lead Me Forward"
 Annie – "Heartbeat"
 Lily Allen – "Smile"
 Kisschasy – "The Shake"
 The Sleepy Jackson – "God Lead Your Soul"
 Nouvelle Vague – "Blue Monday"
 Chicken Lips – "Sweet Cow"
 Gaelle – "Give It Back"
 The Knife – "Marble House"

Disc Two
 Djuma Soundsystem – "Les Djinns (Trentemoller Remix)"
 Mile Caro & Franck Garcia – "Far Away"
 Hot Chip – "Colours (Remixed by Fred Falke)"
 Toby Neal – "My Love (Putsch '79 Disco Mix)"
 Hot Toddy – "Slave To You"
 Kaskade – "In This Life"
 Latrice – "Love Is"
 Ron Hall & The Mothafunkaz feat. Marc Evans – "The Way You Love Me (Dim's T.S.O.P Version)"
 Soul Central feat. Billie – "In-Ten-City (Vocal Mix)"
 Liquid People – "Son of Dragon"
 Roberto De Carlo feat. Joshua – "Magic Star"
 Soul Creation – "Nia's Journey Back"
 And If – "Finest Dream (Original Instrumental Mix)"
 Dab Hands – "DYOT"
 Tennishiro feat. Chelonis R. Jones – "Alone (Original Vocal Version)"
 Milke – "She Says (Wahoo Remix)"
 Mattafix – "To and Fro (Chicken Lips Remix)"
 WhoMadeWho – "Space For Rent"

Chillout Sessions 10

Chillout Sessions 10 is the tenth installment of the Chillout Sessions series of compilations, released by Ministry of Sound.

Disc One
 Sébastien Tellier – "La Ballade du Georges"
 Husky Rescue – "Diamonds in the Sky"
 Caribou – "Hello Hammerheads"
 José González – "Down The Line"
 Angus and Julia Stone – "The Beast"
 Salmonella Dub – "Love Sunshine And Happiness"
 Mattafix – "Living Darfur"
 The Beauty Room – "Holding On"
 The Bird and the Bee – "Again & Again"
 Sia – "Pictures"
 Amy Winehouse – "Back to Black"
 OutKast – "Idlewild Blue (Don'tchu Worry 'Bout Me)"
 Emilie Simon – "Fleur De Saison"
 Au Revoir Simone – "Sad Song"
 Misha – "Losing"
 Amp Fiddler feat. Corinne Bailey Rae – "If I Don't (Foreign Beggars Remix)"
 Robert Gomez – "All We Got"
 Grizzly Bear – "Knife"
 Menomena – "Wet And Rusting"
 Blonde Redhead – "Silently"

Disc Two
 1gnition – "Secret Sunday Lover (Original 12" Instrumental)"
 Tracey Thorn – "It's All True (Escort Extended Remix)"
 Just Fascination – "The Rain (Original Mix)"
 Osunlade – "April (Extended Mix)"
 Mood II Swing feat. Tara J – "Passing Time (Main Vocal Mix)"
 Office Gossip – "Say It"
 Mark Grant feat. Russoul – "Guessin Again (Soul Bounce Remix Vocal)"
 Troydon – "I'm With Ya (Joshua Heath's Play That Bass Mix)"
 Carl Kennedy vs M.Y.N.C. Project feat. Roachford – "Ride The Storm (Carl Kennedy Remix)"
 Chris Lake feat. Emma Hewitt – "Carry Me Away (Original Club Mix)"
 Soul Central feat. Abigail Bailey – "Time After Time (Original)"
 Trentemøller feat. Ane Trolle – "Moan (Trentemøller Vocal Version)"
 Ida Engberg – "Disco Volante (Sébastien Léger Remix)"
 Dusty Kid – "Cowboys"
 Booka Shade – "Karma Car"
 Junior Boys – "The Equalizer"
 Hot Chip – "My Piano"
 Midnight Juggernauts – "Into The Galaxy"

Chillout Classics

Disc 1
 Jakatta – "American Dream (Afterlife Remix)"
 Tall Paul vs INXS – "Precious Heart (Lush Remix)"
 Hybrid – "Finished Symphony (Hybrid Soundtrack Edit Mix)"
 Coldcut – "Autumn Leaves (Irresistible Force Remix Trip 2)"
 Goldfrapp – "Black Cherry"
 Michael Andrews feat. Gary Jules – "Mad World"
 Lamb – "Gorecki"
 The Sabres of Paradise – "Smokebelch II (Beatless Mix)"
 Sub Sub – "Past"
 Three Drives – "Greece 2000 (Moonwatcher Mix)"
 Air – "La Femme D'argent"
 Zero 7 – "Destiny"
 Groove Armada – "My Friend"
 Jamiroquai – "Corner of the Earth"
 Röyksopp – "Remind Me"
 Alpinestars – "Burning Up"
 Coldplay – "The Scientist"
 Radiohead – "Street Spirit (Fade Out)"

Disc 2
 Nitin Sawhney – "Sunset (Prophesy Album Version)"
 Massive Attack – "Karmacoma"
 Bomb the Bass feat. Justin Warfield – "Bug Powder Dust (Kruder & Dorfmeister Session Remix)"
 Leftfield – "Original"
 Smoke City – "Underwater Love"
 Robert Dougan – "Clubbed to Death (Kurayamino Variation)"
 Charles Webster – "Ready"
 Morcheeba – "The Sea"
 Sofa Surfers – "Sofa Rockers (Richard Dorfmeister Remix)"
 Nightmares on Wax – "Les Nuits"
 Saint Etienne – "Only Love Can Break Your Heart (Weatherall Mix)"
 Moby – "Why Does My Heart Feel So Bad?"
 Depeche Mode – "Useless (The Kruder + Dorfmeister Session)"
 Mark Farina feat. Sean Hayes – "Dream Machine"
 Crazy Penis – "Beautiful People"
 Sia – "Breathe Me (Mylo Remix)"
 Nuyorican Soul – "I am the Black Gold of the Sun (4 Hero Remix Edit)"

Disc 3
 Ian Pooley – "Whats Your Number (Jazzanova Renumber)"
 Soldiers of Twilight – "Believe (Martin Solveig Vocal Club)"
 Gaelle – "Give it Back (Eric's Wollman Dub)"
 Moloko – "Familiar Feeling (Martin Buttrich Remix)"
 Blue Six – "Music & Wine (Th'attaboy Vocal)"
 Everything but the Girl vs Soul Vision – "Tracey in My Room (Lazy Dog Bootleg Vocal)"
 Télépopmusik – "Breathe"
 Lisa Shaw – "Always (Lovetronic Vocal)"
 St. Germain – "Rose Rouge"
 Mr. Scruff – "Get a Move On"
 Bent – "Swollen (Francois K Vocal)"
 Sade – "By Your Side (Ben Watt Lazy Dog Remix)"
 Dirty Vegas – "Days Go By (Album Version)"
 Hardsoul feat. Ron Carroll – "Back Together (Classic Mix)"
 X-Press 2 feat. David Byrne – "Lazy"
 Beth Orton – "Central Reservation (The Then Again Version)"
 Doctor Rockit – "Café de Flore (Charles Webster's Latin Lovers Mix)"
 Herbert – "The Audience"

Chillout Sessions XI

Chillout Sessions XI is the eleventh installment of the Chillout Sessions series of compilations, released by Ministry of Sound. It is the first of the Chillout Sessions to use Roman Numerals in the title, instead of standard numbers.

Disc One
 Kasper Bjorke feat. Allison Pierce – "Doesn't Matter (Trentemøller remix)"
 Radiohead – "Weird Fishes/Arpeggi"
 José González – "Teardrop"
 Feist – "So Sorry"
 Lisa Mitchell – "Neopolitan Dreams"
 Bat For Lashes – "What's a Girl To Do?"
 Ratatat – "Falcon Jab"
 Hot Chip – "Made in the Dark"
 The Presets – "If I Know You"
 Sam Sparro – "Black & Gold"
 Empire of the Sun – "Walking on a Dream"
 MGMT – "Electric Feel"
 Cut Copy – "Feel The Love"
 Sébastien Tellier – "Divine"
 Ted & Francis – "Erlend"
 Metronomy – "Heartbreaker"
 Ladytron – "Ghosts (Modwheelmood Remix)"
 The Dø – "On My Shoulders"
 PNAU – "With You Forever"

Disc Two
 Aeroplane – "Above the Clouds"
 Al Usher – "Here Today"
 Low Motion Disco – "Love Love Love (Soft Rocks Remix)"
 Mission Control – "Innerspace (Long John Saliva remix)"
 Kaoru Inoue – "The Secret Field (Todd Terje remix)"
 Popular Computer feat. Pacific! – "Lost & Found"
 Shazam – "Luckier"
 40 Thieves feat. Qzen – "Don't Turn It Off"
 Cazals – "Life is Boring (Ali Love/Harder Remix)"
 Amy Winehouse – "Tears Dry on Their Own (Al Usher Remix)"
 CSS – "Move (Cut Copy Remix)"
 Panthers – "Goblin City (Holy Ghost! Remix)"
 Black Kids – "Hurricane Jane (The Twelves Mix)"
 Bag Raiders – "Shooting Stars"
 Fred Falke – "909 PM at the Beach"
 Pacific! – "Break Your Social System"
 DiskJokke – "Folk I Farta"
 Rufus Wainwright – "Tiergarten (Supermayer Remix)"

Chillout Sessions XII

Chillout Sessions XII is the twelfth installment of the Chillout Sessions series of compilations, released by Ministry of Sound.

Disc One
 Duffy – "Stepping Stone" (Original mix)
 Sarah Blasko – All I Want (Original mix)
 Lisa Mitchell – See You When You Get Here (Original mix)
 Tame Impala – Sundown Syndrome (Original mix)
 Fink – Sort of Revolution (Cinematic Orchestra Radio Edit)
 Josh Pyke – The Summer (Original mix)
 Miike Snow – Burial (Original mix)
 Daniel Merriweather feat. Wale – Change (Original mix)
 Lykke Li – I'm Good, I'm Gone (Original mix)
 Jenny Wilson – Anchor Made of Gold (Original mix)
 Peter Bjorn And John – Nothing To Worry About (Original mix)
 Two Door Cinema Club – Something Good Can Work (Original mix)
 Lost Valentinos – Serio (Original mix)
 Au Revoir Simone – Shadows (Original mix)
 Bat For Lashes – Daniel (Original mix)
 Ryskee feat. Leslie Ming – Leave Me Amor (Bloody Beetroots Remix)
 Empire of the Sun – Standing on the Shore (Original mix)
 MGMT – Weekend Wars (Album Version)
 The Temper Trap – Sweet Disposition (Original mix)
 La Roux – In for the Kill (Skream's Let's Get Ravey Remix)
 Fever Ray – When I Grow Up (Original mix)

Disc Two
 Grace Jones – Williams' Blood (Greg Wilson Remix)
 Phoenix – Lisztomania (Classixx Version)
 Friendly Fires – Paris (Aeroplane Remix)
 Paul Dempsey – Ramona Was A Waitress (Faux Pas Remix)
 James Yuill – This Sweet Love (Prins Thomas Sneaky Re-Edit)
 Damn Arms – Destination Pt 1. (Original mix)
 Sia – Buttons (CSS Remix)
 The Golden Filter – Solid Gold (Extended Version)
 Metric – Help I'm Alive (Original mix)
 Bertie Blackman – Thump (Wild Turkeys Remix)
 Lost Valentinos – Thief (Nile Delta Remix)
 The Juan Maclean – One Day (Original Version)
 MSTRKRFT feat. John Legend – Heartbreaker (Original mix)
 Metronomy – A Thing For Me (Breakbot Remix)
 Ladyhawke – My Delirium (Chateau Marmont Remix)
 Sébastien Tellier – Kilometre (Original mix)
 Simian Mobile Disco – Audacity of Huge (Allez Allez Remix)
 Vampire Weekend – The Kids Don't Stand A Chance (Chromeo Remix)
 Beni – My Love Sees You (Classixx Version)
 Grizzly Bear – Two Weeks (Fred Falke Remix)

Chillout Sessions XIII

Chillout Sessions XIII is the thirteenth installment of the Chillout Sessions series of compilations, released by Ministry of Sound.

Disc One
 Washington – Lover / Soldier
 Angus & Julia Stone – Big Jet Plane
 The XX – Islands
 Sia – I'm in Here
 Erykah Badu – Window Seat
 Smoove & Turrell – Without You
 Bibio – Lover's Carvings
 Jonathan Boulet – A Community Service Announcement
 Neon Indian – Deadbeat Summer
 The Superimposers – The Beach
 Space Invadas – Imaginist
 Big Boi ft. Sleepy Brown & Joi – Turns Me On
 Dan Black ft. Kid Cudi – Symphonies
 Miike Snow – Sans Soleil
 The National – Runaway
 Kings of Convenience – Misread
 Sally Seltmann – Harmony to My Heartbeat
 Ernest Ellis – Heading for the Cold
 Gypsy & The Cat – Time To Wander

Disc Two
 Smoove & Turrell – The Difference
 Crazy P – Never Gonna Reach Me (Hot Toddy Remix)
 Sarah Blasko – Hold on My Heart (The Presets Remix)
 The Chemical Brothers – Swoon (Lindstrøm & Prins Thomas Re-Edit)
 Flight Facilities ft. Giselle – Crave You (C90s Remix)
 Miike Snow – Animal (Mark Ronson Remix)
 Aeroplane – We Can't Fly
 Chilly Gonzales – Knight Moves
 Breakbot ft. Outlines – Baby I'm Yours
 Miami Horror ft. Alan Palamo – Holidays
 Little Red – Rock It (Dublin Aunts Remix)
 Tensnake – Coma Cat
 Florence & The Machine – Rabbit Heart (Raise It Up) (Leo Zero Remix)
 The Temper Trap – Sweet Disposition (Cagedbaby Paradise 45 Remix)
 Robyn – Dancing on My Own (Fred Falke Remix)
 Project 808 – Pacific 202 (Mark Moore Passionado Remix)
 Azari & Ill – Reckless With Your Love (Tensnake Remix)
 Groove Armada – History

Chillout Sessions XIV

Chillout Sessions XIV is the fourteenth instalment of the Chillout Sessions series of compilations, released by Ministry of Sound.

Disc One
 Gotye feat. Kimbra – Somebody That I Used To Know (Bibio Remix)
 Feist – How Come You Never Go There
 Seeker Lover Keeper – All My Lights
 Aloe Blacc – I Need A Dollar
 Asa – Why Can't We
 Kimbra – Cameo Lover (Electric Empire Remix)
 Hypnolove – Holiday Reverie
 Metronomy – The Look
 Oh Mercy – Let Me Go
 Little Dragon – Feather
 Frank Ocean – Swim Good
 Cut Copy – Need You Now (Architecture in Helsinki Version)
 The Temper Trap – Fools
 The Drums – Money
 Example – Last Ones Standing (Ed Sheeran Remix)
 Switch & Andrea Martin – I Still Love You
 Gil Scott-Heron & Jamie xx – I'll Take Care of U
 The Good Natured – Wolves (Crystal Fighters Remix)
 Beach House – Norway

Disc Two
 Washed Out – Eyes Be Closed
 Blood Orange – Sutphin Boulevard
 Simone Fedi – Bitter Devotion
 Clubfeet – Edge of Extremes
 Flight Facilities feat. Jess – Foreign Language
 !!! – Steady As The Sidewalk Cracks
 SBTRKT feat. Roses Gabor – Pharaohs
 Bibio – Anything New
 Gigamesh feat. Amanda Love – Red Light
 Magnifik – We Really Love This Song (Original Mix)
 Storm Queen – Look Right Through (Vocal Mix)
 Midnight Magic – Beam Me Up (Jacques Renault Remix)
 James Curd feat. JDub – We Just Won't Stop
 Lykke Li – I Follow Rivers (The Magician Remix)
 Siriusmo – Nights Off
 Ray Foxx – The Trumpeter (Guti Remix)
 Omar – Feeling You (Henrik Schwarz Remix)
 Lovebirds feat. Stee Downes – Want You in My Soul
 Paul Kalkbrenner – Sky and Sand
 Mario & Vidis feat. Jazzu – I'll Be Gone (Extended Original)
 Azari & III – Into The Night (Nicolas Jaar Remix)
 Bronnt Industries Kapital – An Index of Corporate Art

Chillout Sessions XV

Chillout Sessions XV

Chillout Sessions XV is the fifteenth installment of the Chillout Sessions series of compilations, released by Ministry of Sound.

Disc One
 Missy Higgins – Everyone's Waiting
 Gotye – Eyes Wide Open (Yeasayer Remix)
 Jessie Ware – Wildest Moments
 Major Lazer feat. Amber Coffman – Get Free
 Frank Ocean -Thinkin' Bout You
 The Bamboos feat. Aloe Blacc – Where Does The Time Go?
 The Presets – Ghosts
 Florence + The Machine – Spectrum
 The XX – Chained
 Totally Enormous Extinct Dinosaurs – Garden
 Angus Stone – Broken Brights
 Alpine – Gasoline
 Chet Faker – Terms And Conditions
 Panama – Magic
 Saint Lou Lou – Maybe You
 Paloma Faith – Let Me Down Easy
 Grimes – Genesis
 Bobby Womack – Please Forgive My Heart
 Hermitude – HyperParadise
 The Temper Trap – Trembling Hands

Disc Two
 Flight Facilities feat. Christine Hoberg – Clair De Lune
 Hot Chip – Look at Where We Are
 Goldroom feat. Chela – Fifteen
 Lana Del Rey – National Anthem (Afterlife Remix)
 Flume feat. Jezzabell Doran – Sleepless
 Disclosure feat. Sinead Harnett – Boiling
 Van She – Jamaica
 Dune – Shoestring
 DCUP – I'm Corrupt
 Munk & Peaches – You Can't Run From My Love
 Storm Queen – Look Right Through
 M83 – Reunion (Mylo Remix)
 Volta Bureau – Alley Cat
 James Curd – Guide Me
 Twinsy – Water Bombs
 The Other Tribe – Skirts
 Elton John vs Pnau – Phoenix
 Favored Nation – Blame Game (Alternate Mix)
 Bloc Party – Octopus (RAC Remix)
 Purity Ring – Fineshrine
 LOL Boys feat. Angelina Lucero – Get Close To Me
 Elizabeth Rose feat. Sinden – Again

Chillout Sessions XVI

Chillout Sessions XVI is the sixteenth installment of the Chillout Sessions series of compilations, released by Ministry of Sound.

Disc One
 London Grammar – Strong	
 Chet Faker Feat. Kilo Kish – Melt	
 Lana Del Rey – Summertime Sadness (Radio Mix)	
 Naughty Boy Feat. Sam Smith – La La La (Pále Remix)
 HAIM – Falling	
 Ben Pearce – What I Might Do (Kilter Remix)
 Bibio – À Tout À L'Heure	
 Vance Joy – Riptide	
 Jagwar Ma – Come Save Me	
 Big Scary – Luck Now	
 Disclosure Feat. Eliza Doolittle – You & Me (Flume Remix)
 George Maple – Fixed (Maribou State Remix)
 Kilter Feat. YOUTH – Hold Me	
 AlunaGeorge – Your Drums, Your Love	
 The Kite String Tangle – Given A Chance	
 Snakadaktal – Fall Underneath	
 MS MR – Hurricane (CHVRCHES Remix)
 Andy Bull – Baby I Am Nobody Now	
 Ngaiire – Around
	
Disc Two
 Hayden James – Permission To Love	
 The Preatures	– Is This How You Feel? (Classixx Remix)
 Phoenix – Trying To Be Cool (Breakbot Remix)
 Rudimental Feat. Foxes – Right Here (Krystal Klear Remix)
 Classixx – Holding On	
 Flight Facilities Feat. Elizabeth Rose – I Didn't Believe	
 FCL – It's You (James Curd Remix)
 Miami Horror – Real Slow	
 RÜFÜS* – Sundream	
 Klangkarussell – Sonnentanz (Radio Version)	
 Storm Queen – Look Right Through (MK Dub III Edit)
 Favored Nations – The Strain (Nora En Pure Remix)
 Hot Natured Feat. The Egyptian Lover*	– Isis (Magic Carpet Ride)	
 Acaddamy – Gave Up	
 Empire of the Sun – Alive (Gold Fields Remix)
 Duke Dumont Feat. A*M*E – Need U 100% (Skreamix)
 Dillon Francis Feat. Totally Enormous Extinct Dinosaurs – Without You	
 Touch Sensitive – Pizza Guy	
 Yolanda Be Cool Feat. Gurrumul* – A Baru in New York (Flume Remix)

Chillout Sessions XVII

Chillout Sessions XVII is the seventeenth installment of the Chillout Sessions series of compilations, released by Ministry of Sound.

Disc One
 Mr Probz – Waves	
 Angus & Julia Stone – Heart Beats Slow	
 Milky Chance – Stolen Dance
 Chet Faker – Gold
 The Preatures	– Two Tone Melody	
 Lana Del Rey – West Coast
 Alt-J	– Arrival in Narra	
 Sam Smith – Stay With Me
 George Maple – Talk Talk	
 London Grammar – If You Wait
 Gorgon City Feat. Laura Welsh	– Here For You (Bearcubs Remix)
 ZHU – Paradise Awaits
 The Kite String Tangle – Arcadia
 ODESZA Feat. Madelyn Grant – Memories That You Call
 Kilter Feat. Ev Jones – All You Want
 Vance Joy – Mess Is Mine	
 Jungle – Time
 Peking Duk Feat. Nicole Millar – High (Yahtzel Remix)
 Arkon Fly – Back Seat	
 BROODS – Mother & Father
 Japanese Wallpaper Feat. Wafia – Breathe In
 BANKS – Beggin' For Thread
	
Disc Two
 RÜFÜS – Sarah (Touch Sensitive Remix)	
 Flight Facilities Feat. Emma Louise – Two Bodies
 Luke Million – Light & Sound
 Filous Feat. Kitty Georgi – Summer
 Wankelmut & Emma Louise – My Head Is A Jungle (MK Remix)
 Flight Facilities Feat. Elizabeth Rose – I Didn't Believe	
 TCTS Feat. K Stewart – Games
 Oliver $ & Jimi Jules – Pushing On	
 Klingande – Jubel	
 Watermät – Bullit
 The Magician Feat. Years & Years – Sunlight
 Favored Nations – The Strain (Nora En Pure Remix)
 Parra for Cuva Feat. Anna Naklab – Wicked Games
 Acaddamy – Gave Up	
 Motez	– Own Up
 Bondax – All I See
 Faul, Wad Ad & Pnau – Changes
 Caribou – Can't Do Without You	
 Octave Minds – Anthem
 Shift K3y Feat. Todd Oliver – Touch (Oxford Remix)
 Tensnake Feat. Nile Rodgers & Fiora –	Love Sublime
 Tkay Maidza – U-Huh (Luke Million Remix)
 Attaque – Change Your Mind

Chillout Sessions XVIII

Chillout Sessions XVIII is the eighteenth installment of the Chillout Sessions series of compilations, released by Ministry of Sound.

Disc One
 Sufjan Stevens – Should Have Known Better	
 Tame Impala – 'Cause I'm A Man	
 Flight Facilities Feat. Owl Eyes – Heart Attack (Julian Hamilton Rework)
 Daniel Johns – Aerial Love
 Airling – Stallin'	
 Tuka – My Star
 Alt-J	– Arrival in Narra	
 Sarah Blasko – Only One
 Favored Nations – I Can See You	
 José González	– Let It Carry You
 Gorgon City Feat. Laura Welsh	– Here For You (Bearcubs Remix)
 Mac DeMarco – The Way You'd Love Her
 Alabama Shakes – Don't Wanna Fight
 ODESZA Feat. Madelyn Grant – Memories That You Call
 Hiatus Kaiyote – By Fire	
 Chet Faker – Bend
 SG Lewis Feat. Louis Mattrs* – No Less
 Arkon Fly – Back Seat	
 Flume Feat. Andrew Wyatt – Some Minds
 Troye Sivan Feat. Broods – EASE
 A$AP Rocky – L$D
 SAFIA – Embracing Me
 Kygo Feat. Will Heard	– Nothing Left
 Paces Feat. Reija Lee	– Hold It Down (StéLouse Remix)
	
Disc Two
 Basenji Feat. Scenic – Petals	
 Jamie xx Feat. Romy – Loud Places
 Cosmo's Midnight Feat. KUČKA – Walk With Me
 Miami Horror Feat. Queen Magic – Sober
 Wankelmut & Emma Louise – My Head Is A Jungle (MK Remix)
 Duke Dumont – Ocean Drive
 Escort – Body Talk
 Oliver $ & Jimi Jules – Pushing On	
 Set Mo Feat. ALPHAMAMA – Chasing Forever	
 Chez Moune – Away
 Rudimental Feat. Foy Vance – Never Let You Go (Feder Remix)
 Favored Nations – The Strain (Nora En Pure Remix)
 Sigala – Easy Love (Miguel Campbell Remix)
 POOLCLVB Feat. Natalie Conway – Move Me	
 RÜFÜS – You Were Right
 Porsches – Karate
 Faul, Wad Ad & Pnau – Changes
 Claptone Feat. Peter, Bjorn And John – Puppet Theatre	
 Octave Minds – Anthem
 Andras & Oscar – (I Know) What You Want
 Lost Frequencies – Are You With Me
 LANY – ILYSB (I Love You So Bad)
 Monkey Safari – Cranes
 Kölsch Feat. Gregor Schwellenbach – Talbot
 Gilligan Moss	– Choreograph

Chillout Sessions XIX

Chillout Sessions XIX is the nineteenth installment of the Chillout Sessions series of compilations, released by Ministry of Sound.

Disc One
 Vera Blue – Hold	
 Shura – Touch	
 Jack Garratt – Worry	
 Michael Kiwanuka – Love & Hate	
 Sampha – Timmy's Prayer	
 Matt Corby – Knife Edge	
 Låpsley – Cliff	
 Kllo – Walls To Build	
 Kaytranada – Lite Spots	
 Of Empress – Woman Is A Word	
 James Vincent McMorrow – Rising Waters	
 Polographia Feat. Winston Surfshirt – Sly	
 Big Scary – The Opposite of Us	
 Future Islands – Haunted By You	
 Emma Louise –	Talk Baby Talk	
 Klue – My Friend	
 Tony Allen Feat. Damon Albarn – Go Back	
 The Avalanches – Subways	
 JNTHN STEIN –	CMPRSSN	
 Flume Feat. Tove Lo –	Say It

Disc Two	
 Paces Feat. Guy Sebastian – Desert
 Kings – Don't Worry 'Bout It	
 GoldLink – Dark Skin Women (Cosmo's Midnight & Swindail Remix)
 The Meeting Tree – Life Is Long: Slow Down!	
 ZHU – Generationwhy	
 Honne & Izzy Bizu – Someone That Loves You	
 Kraak & Smaak Feat. Cleopold – Alone With You	
 D.D Dumbo – Satan	
 Gold Panda – Chiba Nights	
 Zayn – Like I Would (Oliver Nelson Remix)
 Fatherdude – No Complaints (Dr Packer Remix)
 RÜFÜS – Say A Prayer For Me	
 Set Mo – See Right Through Me	
 Rudimental Feat. Joseph Angel	– Healing
 Duke Dumont – Be Here	
 Hayden James – Just A Lover	
 Justin Martin Feat. Femme – Hello Clouds
 Aurora – I Went Too Far (MK Remix Radio Edit)
 Dro Carey Feat. Kučka	– Queensberry Rules

Chillout Sessions XX

Chillout Sessions XX is the twentieth installment of the Chillout Sessions series of compilations, released by Ministry of Sound and was released in April 2018.

Disc One 
 Kygo (featuring Justin Jesso & Bergen Philharmonic Orch) – Stargazing (Orchestral Version)
 Rhye – Song for you
 Camelphat & Elderbrook – Cola (Simon Mills Full Sugar Mix)
 Motez, Antony & Cleopatra – The Future
 Calvin Harris (featuring Frank Ocean & Migos) – Slide
 Cosmo's Midnight (featuring Winston Surfshirt) – Get to know
 Sam Gouthro – Down for this
 A Tribe Called Quest – Bonita applebum (Pharrell Williams Remix)
 Kwabs – Wrong or right
 Leisure – Money
 Cloud Control – Summer rave
 Tender – Outside
 Potbelleez – Here on earth (Winter Fjord Orchestral Mix)
 Mama Ghost – I ran
 Sohn – Red lines
 Lo Moon – Loveless
 Pilotpriest – Archive Seven
 Elbow – Mirrorball
 MGMT – Hand it over
 Red Box – Everybody's gotta learn sometime.

Disc Two 
 Bonobo – Kerala
 Icarus – No sleep
 Braille Face – Faraway
 POOLCLVB (featuring Doolie) – Freefall
 Freischwimmer – California dreaming
 Sneaky Sound System – I love it 2018 (superlover remix)
 Cali Satellites (featuring TIAAN) – In the sunshine (AG remix)
 Anabel Englund – London headache
 Flight Facilities (featuring Broods, Reggie Watts & Saro) – Stranded (LNTG Remix)
 Luke Million (featuring Fluir) – Alive
 Home – Warmth
 Flamingo – Hypnotized
 Mansionair – Astronaut (something about your love)
 Elk Road (featuring Julia Stone) – Solid Gold
 MØ – Turn my heart to stone
 L D R U (featuring Boi) – Me (Akouo remix)
 Moby – Porcelain (arty remix)
 Danny Barwick – Flickering
 Willow Beats – Be kind to yourself
 Morgan Saint – You
 Chicane – Gorecki
 Wafia (featuring Finneas) – The ending.

The Chillout Guide

Disc one
 Fortunato & Montresor – Imagine
 Yonderboi – Papadam
 I Monster – Daydream in Blue
 Groove Armada – At the River
 Chicane – Offshore (Album Mix)
 Jakatta – American Dream (Afterlife Mix)
 Zero 7 – Give It Away
 Pepe Deluxe Leave (Radio Edit) – Before You Leave
 Hairy Diamond – Givin Up
 Brooke Russell – So Sweet (Rae & Christian Remix)
 Nightmares on Wax – Les Nuits
 Trio Electrico – Return of the Coconut Groove
 Trüby Trio – A Go Go (Boozoo Bajou Mix)
 Boozoo Bajou – Night Over Manaus
 Serge Gainsbourg – Je T'aime (Dzihan & Kamien Remix)
 Mo Horizons – Foto Viva
 Ultra Naté – Twisted (4 Hero Mix)
 Nils Petter Molvaer – Vilderness (Chilluminati Remix)
 Beanfield – The Season (Video Edit)
 Waldeck – This Isn't Maybe

Disc two
 Seelenluft – Wasser-Kür 1
 Paul Van Dyk – Vega
 Chicane – No Ordinary Morning
 Matthias Schaffhäuser – Hey Little Girl
 Moby – Natural Blues
 Orion – Eternity (Acoustic Mix)
 Afro Medusa – Pasilda (Afterlife Mix)
 Wamdue Project – King of My Castle (Original Radio Edit)
 Alex Gopher – The Child
 Nalin & Kane – Beachball
 Energy 52 – Café Del Mar (Michael Woods Remix)
 Underworld – Cups (Salt City Orchestra's Vertical Bacon Vocal)
 Aural Float – At The Crossroads
 The Beloved – The Sunrising (Album Mix)
 Schiller – Das Glockenspiel (Schill Out Mix)
 The Aloof – One Night Stand (7" Edit)
 Leftfield – Melt
 Gregory Isaacs – Night Nurse (Kruder & Dorfmeister Remix)
 Dusted – Always Remember To Respect And Honour Your Mother
 Fischerspooner – The 15th

Chilled 1991–2008

Disc 1
 Little Fluffy Clouds – The Orb
 Clubbed to Death (Kurayamino Variation) – Rob Dougan
 Sweet Harmony – The Beloved
 Smokebelch II (Beatless Mix) – The Sabres of Paradise
 Offshore – Chicane
 Fireside Favourite – Groove Armada
 Fanfare of Life – Leftfield
 Fun For Me – Moloko
 Demons – Fatboy Slim featuring Macy Gray
 Underwater Love – Smoke City
 Yachts – A Man Called Adam Vs. Coco Steel & Lovebomb
 Waltz For Koop – Koop
 One Night Samba – Tim "Love" Lee
 Exploration – The Karminsky Experience Inc.
 Past – Sub Sub
 Ocean Beach (Cybophonia Cinematic Remix) – The Black Mighty Orchestra
 Autumn Leaves (Irresistible Force Mix Trip 1) – Coldcut
 Second Hand – Underworld
 Les Nuits – Nightmares on Wax
 Moments in Love – Art of Noise

Disc 2
 Barber's Adagio for Strings (Ferry Corsten Remix) – William Orbit
 His Majesty King Raam – Lemon Jelly
 Daydream in Blue – I Monster
 La Ritournelle – Sébastien Tellier
 Romeo (Acoustic Version) – Basement Jaxx
 Heaven (Yanou's Candlelight Mix) – DJ Sammy
 I Love My Man – Bent
 Since I Left You – The Avalanches
 Corner of the Earth – Jamiroquai
 Lebanese Blonde – Thievery Corporation
 Once Around The Block (Andy Votel Remix) – Badly Drawn Boy
 Can't Be Doin' With Love – Cicada
 Kota – Bonobo
 Sleepy Meadows of Buxton – Fenomenon
 The Sensual Woman – The Herbaliser
 Heartbeats – José González
 Dice – Finley Quaye
 Young Folks (OrtzRoka Remix) – Peter Bjorn & John
 Hayling – FC Kahuna
 Nude – Radiohead

Disc 3
 American Dream – Jakatta
 Missing (Todd Terry Club Remix) – Everything But The Girl
 2 Lazy – X-Press 2
 Do It Now – Dubtribe Sound System
 Prix Choc – Etienne De Crecy
 Swimming Places (Sebastian Ingrosso Re-Edit) – Julien Jabre
 In My Arms – Mylo
 Bumcop – Crazy P
 I Feel Space – Lindstrøm
 Eple – Röyksopp
 I Believe – Simian Mobile Disco
 Café De Flore – dr. rockit
 Divebomb – The Whip
 Deepest Blue (Jon Hopkins Mix) – Deepest Blue
 Another Chance (Afterlife Remix) – Roger Sanchez
 Rapture (Soulside Remix) – iiO
 Sun (Kössin Mix) – Slusnik Luna
 Greece 2000 (Moowatcher Mix) – Three Drives
 Silence (Michael Woods Remix) – Delerium
 Finished Symphony (Soundtrack Edit) – Hybrid

Chilled II 1991–2009

The first sequel, Chilled II 1991–2009, was released on 17 May 2009.

The cover art for the album used on the slipcase depicts the Ministry of Sound logo uprising out of water.

Although well received, some criticism has been made for CD 3 of the album, with many describing it as dance music rather than chill out.

Disc 1
 808 State – Pacific State
 The Beloved – Sun Rising
 Leftfield – Original
 Primal Scream & Denise Johnson – Don't Fight It, Feel It
 Sneaker Pimps – Underground
 Groove Armada – At The River
 St. Germain – Dub Experience II
 A Man Called Adam – Barefoot in the Head
 Moloko – Sing It Back
 Kinobe – Slip into Something More Comfortable
 Rae & Christian feat. Veba – Spellbound
 Aim – Cold Water Music
 Ballistic Brothers – Blacker
 Mr. Scruff – Get A Move On
 Cut La Roc – New York Pimp
 Kruder & Dorfmeister – Black Baby
 World Party – Is It Too Late (Peter Lorimer Mix)
 The Prodigy – 3 Kilos
 Olive – You're Not Alone (Nightmares on Wax Mix)
 Deadly Avenger – We Took Pelham

Disc 2
 Coldplay – Trouble
 Air – All I Need
 Faithless – Drifting Away
 Zero 7 – Destiny
 Lemon Jelly – In The Bath
 Roots Manuva – Witness (1 Hope)
 Max Sedgley – Happy
 Daft Punk – Digital Love
 Mylo – Valley of the Dolls
 Jakatta – The Other World
 Cicada – Elle Et Moi
 Fatboy Slim – North West Three
 Space Raiders – Beautiful Crazy
 Thievery Corporation – The Cosmic Game
 Pilote – Turtle (Bonobo Remix)
 Flunk – Blue Monday
 Maxence Cyrin – Unfinished Sympathy
 Nouvelle Vague – Teenage Kicks
 Nightmares on Wax – Calling
 Tom Middleton – Serendipity
 Unkle – Tired of Sleeping

Disc 3
 Jakatta – American Dream (Intro)
 Eric Prydz – Pjanoo (Dana Berquist & Peter G Remix)
 Kid Cudi vs. Crookers – Day 'n' Nite (D.O.N.S. Remix)
 Deep Dish – The Future of the Future
 Jean Jaques Smoothie – 2 People
 Underworld – Cups (Salt City Orchestra Mix)
 Jam & Spoon – Stella
 Kings of Tomorrow – Finally
 Röyksopp – Poor Leno
 Bent – Magic Love
 Étienne de Crécy – Le Patron Est Devenu Fou! ("The Boss Has Gone Mad")
 Marshall Jefferson vs. Noosa Heads – Mushrooms (Salt City Orchestra Mix)
 Moby – Go (Subliminal Mix)
 Djuma Soundsystem – Les Djinns
 Alan Braxe & Fred Falke – Chrystal City
 Sébastien Tellier – Kilometer (A-Trak Remix)
 Friendly Fires – Paris (Aeroplane Remix)
 Williams – Love on a Real Train (Williams Odyssey Remix)
 Lindstrøm & Prins Thomas – En Dag I Mai
 StoneBridge feat. Therese – Put 'Em High (Claes Rosen Lounge Mix)
 Chicane – Salt Water

Chilled Acoustic
The second sequel, Chilled Acoustic, was released on 17 May 2010. It is themed to chillout songs which use acoustic guitars, following the themed Anthems Electronic 80s release in November 2009.

A printing error was made on every copy of the album. The top half of the Ministry of Sound logo, which appears on the reverse side of the digipack, is accidentally printed upside down. This error, however, has never been corrected for future releases.

Chillout Afterhours
The fourth installment album in the series was released in May 2011, Chilled Afterhours. It is an album designed for "after hours" playing.

Chilled Sessions
Released on the same day as Chilled 1991–2008, a specific download release, titled Chilled Sessions, was released. It can be purchased as an MP3 download on Amazon.co.uk.

The album itself is a download replacement for Chilled 1991–2008, which was never released as a download. It contains twenty-three of the sixty tracks on the album. Its art work is slightly similar, but there is a light blue background rather than a white one, the image is zoomed-in, and the words "Chilled Sessions" appear obviously instead of "Chilled 1991–2008".

References

External links
 chilloutmoments.com  – smooth rain, nature and wave sounds to chill.
 DI.FM – Chillout – Online Chillout Radio (free and premium)

 
Ministry of Sound compilation albums
Compilation album series
Chill-out music albums
Electronic compilation albums